The football rivalry between Sporting and Boavista FC is considered the hugest  rivalry in both Cape Verde and the island of Santiago and the city Praia, it is known as the.  One of the largest rivalries in the nation and the region before the Mindelo derby (or São Vicente derby) or Mindelense and Derby which is also the longest rivalry.   It forms one of the rivalry being called the Capital Derby (Derby do Capital or the  Clássico da Capital), one of the Praia Derby (Derby da Praia).

History
Since its creation of the regional championships in 1953, there had been around 100 matches that featured Sporting and Boavista, there were also over 100 matches with the cup competitions.

In 2010 the rivalry was taken to the national level in the finals, and formed a part of the Sotavento Derby (Derby de Sotavento) or the Battle of Sotavento (Batalha de Sotavento). Boavista Praia won all two matches and claimed their third and the club's recent title since independence.

Cultural rivalry
Both Sporting Praia and Boavista are affiliates to Lisbon.

Football rivalry
The rivalry is the third longest in Cape Verde after the derbies of Travadores and Vitória Praia and ahead of Académica Praia.

Sporting Praia is one of the most successful football (soccer) club in Cape Verde, having won about 41 official titles (12 national and 29 regional) compared to Boavista's 19 official titles (6 national and 13 regional). On the other hand, Sporting boast of their better performance in African competitions (no Capeverdean team has ever won an African title).  Their greatest success is the participation in the First Round in the 1992 African Cup of Champions Clubs and the 2009 CAF Champions League.  Sporting appeared once in the 2001 CAF Cup Winners' Cup and did not exceed the preliminaries.  While Boavista did not exceed the first round of the 1994 CAF Cup nor the preliminaries of the 1996 African Cup of Champions Clubs.

Honours

Partial matches list

Santiago Island League (South Zone)
The information has selected matches of the challenge from the 2011-12 season

Cape Verdean Football Championships

Head-to-Head ranking in the Santiago South Zone

Men in both teams
 Babanco
 Blessed
 Dário Furtado
Emanuel Temitop Jayirola
 Panduru
 Matthew Mbutidem Sunday

References

External links
The Rec.Sport.Soccer Statistics Foundation

Cape Verde football derbies
Sporting Clube da Praia
Boavista FC (Cape Verde)